The Mule is a short river in Powys, mid Wales, and a tributary of the River Severn. It rises at Black Gate near the west end of Kerry Hill and is joined by a number of streams, principal amongst which is the Nant Meheli, east of Kerry. Initially flowing northeast it turns to flow east at Kerry and then northwest, entering a narrow section of valley near Llanmerewig before joining the Severn at Abermule (Welsh: Aber-miwl meaning 'mouth of the Mule').

References

The Mule